Bhale Ammayilu is a 1957 Indian Telugu-language drama film, produced by V. L. Narasu and directed by Vedantam Raghavayya. It stars Savitri, Girija, and N. T. Rama Rao. Music was jointly composed by S. Rajeswara Rao and S. Hanumantha Rao. The film was simultaneously made in Tamil as Iru Sagodharigal.

Plot 
Saroja and Girija are the daughters of Jayalakshmamma. Both of them learn music at a person Venkatramayya. After some time, Jayalakshmamma passes away and Saroja takes up a job as a housemaid at a rich man Venkatadri's house and also joins Girija in the college. Venkatadri leads a happy family life with his wife Mangamma, his son Dr. Anand, and a daughter Rekha. In college, Girija goes into the trap of a cheater Seshagiri Rao / Mr. Rao, and neglects her studies. Besides, Anand wants to construct a hospital in his village and serve the poor people. As Mangamma is a shrew and Anand is step-son to her, she looks him down. Parallelly, Saroja and Anand fall in love. Meanwhile, Venkataramayya starts a clothes business along with his Rathamma and wastes all the money on lottery tickets. At last, he settles at his friend Zamindar Subramanyam's house, brother-in-law to Venkatadri.

Once Saroja visits the city, where she notices Girija's closeness with Rao, tries to admonish her when she insults her and asks to get away. Depressed, Saroja reaches back when Mangamma knows about her love affair with Anand and throws her out when Anand also decides to leave the house. But unfortunately, Girija re-enters claiming that she has been cheated on and is pregnant at present. At that moment, Saroja decides to set right her sister's life, leaves for the city and Anand becomes distressed as he could not find her whereabouts of Saroja. In the city, Girija gives birth to a baby boy when Anand reaches Saroja and suspects her fidelity witnessing the child with her and quits the place.

Meanwhile, Venkatramayya wins 2 lakhs of the lottery, meets Saroja and Girija, and recognises Rao as the foster son of his friend Subramanyam. Now he makes a plan and asks Girija to stay at Subramanyam's house with the baby and she does so. On the other side, Venkatramayya and Saroja changes their guise and acts like millionaires and traps Rao. At that point, they detect Rao's marriage is fixed with Rekha, so, Saroja separates them when Rekha recognises Saroja and informs Subramanyam. He blames Saroja, brings back Rao, and makes his marriage arrangements with Rekha. On this spot, Rao goes into shock viewing Girija when she requests him not to do injustice to her and the child. Hearing this, Subramanyam locks Girija, knowing it, Saroja and Venkataramayya rushes to Ramavaram. On the way, they meet with an accident and are admitted to Anand's hospital. Through Venkataramayya Anand learns the truth, he requests a pardon of Saroja and by the time, they reach the venue the marriage is completed. Here, to everyone's surprise, Subramanyam keeps Girija in the place of the bride and makes Rao realise his mistake. Finally, the movie ends on a happy note with the marriage of Anand and Saroja.

Cast 
Savitri as Saroja
Girija as Girija
N. T. Rama Rao as Anand
Jaggayya as Seshagiri Rao / Mr. Rao
Relangi as Venkatramayya
C.S.R as Subramanyam
Dr. Sivaramakrishnaiah as Venkatadri
Balakrishna as Neelaiah
Peketi Sivaram as Mohan
Chaya Devi as Mangamma
Hemalatha as Jayalakshmamma
Suryakala as Rathamma
T. Ammaji as Rekha
Baby Sasikala as Sumitra

Soundtrack 
Music composed by  S. Rajeswara Rao and S. Hanumantha Rao.

References

External links 
 

1950s Telugu-language films
1957 drama films
Films about sisters
Films directed by Vedantam Raghavayya
Films scored by S. Rajeswara Rao
Indian drama films